The Kazakhstan Hockey Federation is the governing body of field hockey in Kazakhstan. It is affiliated to IHF International Hockey Federation and AHF Asian Hockey Federation. The headquarters of the federation are in Almaty.

Serik Abikenovich Umbetov is the President of the Kazakhstan Hockey Federation and Serik Kalimbaev is the General Secretary.

See also
 Kazakhstan men's national field hockey team
 Kazakhstan women's national field hockey team

References

External links
 Kazakhstan Hockey Federation

Kazakhstan
Hockey
Field hockey in Kazakhstan